Pterocypha is a genus of moths in the family Geometridae first described by Gottlieb August Wilhelm Herrich-Schäffer in 1855.

Species
Pterocypha defensata Walker, 1862
Pterocypha floridata Walker, [1863]
Pterocypha gibbosaria Herrich-Schäffer, [1855]
Pterocypha lezardata Herbulot, 1988

References

Geometridae